For a List of wars in the 20th century, see:

 List of wars: 1900–1944
 List of wars: 1945–1989
 List of wars: 1990–2002